Dosina mactracea is a species of marine bivalve mollusc in the family Veneridae.

References

Veneridae